Genius of Britain: The Scientists Who Changed the World is a five-part 2010 television documentary presented by leading British scientific figures, which charts the history of some of Britain's most important scientists and innovators.

Presenters

Main Host
Stephen Hawking – Theoretical Physicist, Cosmologist

Segment Presenters
Jim Al-Khalili – Theoretical physicist
David Attenborough – Broadcaster, Naturalist
Richard Dawkins – Evolutionary biologist
James Dyson – Industrial designer
Olivia Judson – Evolutionary biologist
Paul Nurse – Geneticist
Kathy Sykes – Physicist
Robert Winston – Medical doctor, Scientist

Segments

References

External links

Channel 4 documentary series
Documentary films about the history of science
Documentary television series about science
Documentary television series about technology
2010 British television series debuts
2010 British television series endings
2010s British documentary television series
English-language television shows
Industrial history of the United Kingdom
Works about the history of industries